Stanislav Komočar (born 20 February 1967) is a retired Slovenian footballer who played as a forward.

He played in the Slovenian PrvaLiga for HIT Gorica and Gaj Kočevje.

References

1967 births
Living people
Yugoslav footballers
Slovenian footballers
Slovenian football managers
NK Olimpija Ljubljana (1945–2005) players
GNK Dinamo Zagreb players
ND Gorica players
Yugoslav First League players
Association football forwards